HMS Monmouth was the sixth "Duke"-class Type 23 frigate of the Royal Navy. She was the seventh ship to bear the name and was launched by Lady Eaton in 1991, being commissioned two years later.

Affectionately known as "The Black Duke", Monmouth was the only ship in service with the Royal Navy that has its name painted in black (all other RN vessels have their name in red) and flew a plain black flag in addition to the ensign. This is due to the dissolution of the title and the blacking out of the Coat of Arms of the Duke of Monmouth in 1685 following the Monmouth Rebellion against James II of England. Until her decommissioning, Monmouth carried the most battle honours of any ship name that was serving in the Royal Navy. HMS Monmouth was decommissioned on the 30 June 2021 and is now awaiting disposal in Fareham creek under the care of the disposal and reserve ships organisation.

Construction and career

1993–2000

In February 1997, while being prepared for launch in poor weather, Monmouth Lynx helicopter slid off the side of the flight deck and sank off the Devon coast. The aircraft's crew were rescued by the ship's sea boat.

On 11 February 1998, Monmouth was ordered to stand by off Sierra Leone as part of Operation Resilient to provide humanitarian assistance during the Sierra Leone Civil War. In 1999 Monmouth became the first major Royal Navy vessel to visit Dublin, Ireland, since the 1960s.

2001–2010
In early 2004 the ship was assigned to the Atlantic Patrol Task North. Between 2004 and 2006 she was commanded by Jerry Kyd. In 2006 Monmouth underwent operational sea training, conducted by Flag Officer Sea Training, in which she spent six weeks fighting off staged attacks by ships and submarines.

Monmouth returned to berth at her home port HMNB Devonport on 3 December 2007 having completed a circumnavigation of the globe, visiting Australia, New Zealand, and Hawaii and taking part in a FPDA exercise. In 2008 she went into refit and in 2009 deployed to the Persian Gulf, returning in April 2010. On 27 May 2010, she escorted the fleet of "little ships" commemorating the 70th anniversary of Operation Dynamo, the evacuation from Dunkirk on 27 May – 4 June 1940 of approximately 340,000 British and French soldiers, and one of the most celebrated military events in British history.

2011 onwards
Monmouth spent June 2011 in the Indian Ocean patrolling the waters off Somalia as part of the ongoing multi-national anti-piracy operations in the region. The deployment also saw her spend some time in Victoria, the capital of the Seychelles where she took part in the islands' independence celebrations.

In February 2012, Monmouth began a six-week refit period at Devonport's frigate shed, following on from a seven-month deployment in the Indian Ocean which began in 2011. For the refit, the ship was taken out of the water into an enclosed dry-dock.

In May 2013, she returned to her home port after a seven-month mission to the Persian Gulf. Monmouth also hosted an International Principal Warfare Officer's course in 2013. She participated in Exercise Joint Warrior in 2013. From October 2013, Monmouth was operating in home waters as the Fleet Ready Escort.

In June 2015, Monmouth emerged from an 18-month refit in Devonport for sea trials and made her first ever visit to Hamburg, Germany, in December.

In February 2016, Monmouth and her sister  participated in NATO exercise Dynamic Guard in Norwegian waters.

She returned to the UK in time for Christmas 2017.

Monmouth was deployed on 23 August 2018 from Plymouth as escort for the aircraft carrier , as she sailed to the eastern seaboard of the United States for 'Westlant 18', during which the carrier conducted F-35 Lightning II flying trials. HMS Monmouths Wildcat HMA2 helicopter, nicknamed "Blackjack", of 213 Flight, 815 NAS, became the first Wildcat to land aboard HMS Queen Elizabeth on 3 September 2018.

The ship prepared to go into refit in early 2019, and her ship's company became the Starboard crew of sister ship  which is forward-deployed to Bahrain until 2022. By the end of 2020 the ship was reported to have been stripped of weapons and sensors and laid up. On 22 March 2021, it was announced that both Type 23 frigates Monmouth and Montrose would be decommissioned earlier than planned as part of the Ministry of Defence's Integrated Review. As a result of this decision, Monmouth did not undergo a life extension refit as other members of her class have, and is currently awaiting disposal. Monmouth was decommissioned on 30 June 2021.

Related images

Affiliations
1st The Queen's Dragoon Guards
Royal Monmouthshire Royal Engineers
No. 70 Squadron RAF
No. 19 Squadron RAF
Monmouth (town)
Worshipful Company of Drapers

References

External links
 
 

 

Frigates of the United Kingdom
History of Monmouth, Wales
Ships built on the River Clyde
1991 ships
Type 23 frigates of the Royal Navy